Bernt Åke Hedberg (14 December 1929 – 7 April 1971) was a Swedish weightlifter. Competing in the middleweight division in 1952 he won the European title and placed sixth at the Summer Olympics. Next year he moved to a lighter weight category and finished second at the European championships.

References

External links
 

1929 births
1971 deaths
Swedish male weightlifters
Olympic weightlifters of Sweden
Weightlifters at the 1952 Summer Olympics
People from Vansbro Municipality
Sportspeople from Dalarna County
20th-century Swedish people